Gordonia araii  is a Gram-positive and aerobic bacterium from the genus of Gordonia which has been isolated from human sputum in Japan.

References

Further reading

External links
Type strain of Gordonia araii at BacDive -  the Bacterial Diversity Metadatabase

Mycobacteriales
Bacteria described in 2006